Langan is a surname. Notable people with the surname include:

 Bill Langan (1955–2010), American yacht designer and naval architect
 Christopher Michael Langan (born 1952), American known for high IQ
 Dave Langan (born 1957), Irish footballer
 Ezequiel Fernández Langan (born 1978), Argentine politician
 Gary Langan (born 1956), English audio engineer and record producer
 Glenn Langan (1917–1991), American actor, married to actress Adele Jergens
 Joy Langan (1943–2009), member of the Canadian House of Commons
 Patrick A. Langan, American criminologist and statistician
 Peter Langan (1941–1988), Irish restaurateur
 Sarah Langan (born 1974), American horror author
 Sean Langan (born 1964), British journalist and documentary filmmaker
 Tom Langan, American television producer and writer
 Tommy Langan (1921–1974), Irish Gaelic footballer